Jamui is a town and a municipality in Jamui district in the Indian state of Bihar. It is the district headquarter of Jamui district. Jamui was formed as a district on 21 February 1991 as a result of its separation from Munger. It is part of Munger Division. The town is situated about 60km South-West of Munger.

Historical existence of Jamui has been observed from the period of Mahabharta war. Archaeological and historical evidence shows its close association with the Jain tradition for a long past to the present time. A large part of this area is covered by forest.

There are mainly two hypotheses which have been mentioned by historians regarding the origin of the name of the district Jamui. The first hypothesis said that the name of Jamui derived from "Jambhiya Gram" or "Jribhikgram" village, which has the place of attaining ‘Omniscience’ (Kevala Jnana) of Vardhaman Mahavira and according to another hypothesis the name Jamui is originated from Jambuwani.

Geography
Jamui is located at 
. It has an average 
elevation of 78 metres (255 feet).

Situated along the Bihar-Jharkhand border, Jamui is dotted with hills and the small retreat town of Simultala falls within the Jhajha block, on the main Delhi-Howrah rail line. Minto Tower in Gidhaur is a prime example of architecture from the period. Jamui district is also known for having many places related to the origin of Jainism.

The district has untapped reserves of resources including mica, coal, gold and iron ore.

Demographics
 India census,
Jamui had a population of 87,357. Males constitute 52.6% of the population and females 47.26%. Jamui has an average literacy rate of 64.33%, lower than the national average of 74.04%: male literacy is 57.39%, and female literacy is 42.6%. In Jamui, 16.22% of the population is under 6 years of age.

Economy
In 2006 the Ministry of Panchayati Raj named Jamui one of the country's 250 most backward districts (out of a total of 640). It is one of the 36 districts in Bihar currently receiving funds from the Backward Regions Grant Fund Programme (BRGF).

Divisions
 No. of Police District 1
 No. of Sub-Divisions 1
 No. of Blocks 10
 No. of Circles 10
 No. of Police Stations 28
 No. of Panchayats 153
 No. of Villages 1,506

Notable people

Onkarnath Baranwal: an Indian politician from the state of Bihar, Batiya.
Chirag Paswan, Member Of Indian Parliament , National President Lok Janshakti Party (Ram Vilas)
Chandrashekhar Singh: a member of Indian National Congress and served as the Chief Minister of Bihar from Aug 1983 to Mar 1985. He also held a number of Cabinet Ministers positions.
Digvijay Singh: an Indian politician from the state of Bihar and an independent Member of the Parliament of India representing Banka in the Lok Sabha.

References

 
Cities and towns in Anga Desh
Cities and towns in Jamui district